The 1968 Dixie 250 was a NASCAR Grand National Series event that was held on May 3, 1968, at Augusta Speedway in Augusta, Georgia.

This is the only race of the year that eventual 1968 NASCAR Grand National Series champion David Pearson didn't run.

Race report
The race took one hour, forty-two minutes, and thirty-six seconds to reach its full conclusion: Bobby Isaac defeated Buddy Baker by more than a lap; bringing home $1,100 as the winner's top prize ($ when considering inflation).

Canadian driver Frog Fagan participated in this event as the only non-American driver. Bobby Isaac would go on to earn three pole positions during the 1968 NASCAR Grand National Series season and 19 pole positions during the following season; making him a prototypical version of Ryan Newman with his blistering speeds that he would register during qualifying.

Notable crew chiefs who attended the race were Ray Hicks, Frankie Scott, Dale Inman and Harry Hyde.

Total winnings for this event were $6,260 ($ when considering inflation). In this race, Bob Cooper finished in 22nd place and won $100 just for driving a stock car as fast and as efficiently as possible. A man could have easily supported himself by earning $100 a week back in the late-1960s and lived comfortably. In the 21st century, a typical person needs to make at least $1000 a week in order to make ends meet.

The transition to purpose-built racecars began in the early 1960s and occurred gradually over that decade.  Changes made to the sport by the late 1960s brought an end to the "strictly stock" vehicles of the 1950s.

Qualifying

Timeline
Section reference:
 Start of race: Bobby Isaac started the race with the pole position.
 Lap 17: Stan Meserve noticed that his vehicle had a problematic ignition.
 Lap 20: Bill Cooper's engine developed problems.
 Lap 30: Bill Seifett had a terminal crash, causing him to leave the event.
 Lap 54: Henley Grey's vehicle managed to overheat, Frog Fagan's suspension developed problems that ended his day on the track.
 Lap 86: The axle on Richard Petty's vehicle acted up, stopping his race for the weekend.
 Lap 87: The rear end of Roy Tyner's vehicle fell off, forcing him to finish outside the top-15.
 Lap 125: J.D. McDuffie's vehicle developed problems with its rear end.
 Lap 131: Tom Pistone takes over the lead from Bobby Isaac.
 Lap 139: Bobby Isaac takes over the lead from Tom Pistone.
 Lap 158: LeeRoy Yarbrough's vehicle developed problems with its rear end.
 Lap 170: John Sears' vehicle developed problems with its rear end.
 Lap 175: Neil Castles' engine became problematic.
 Lap 188: Elmo Langley's vehicle developed a problematic engine.
 Lap 233: Frank Warren suffered a terminal crash, forcing him out of the race.
 Finish: Bobby Isaac was officially declared the winner of the event.

Finishing order
Section reference:

 Bobby Isaac (No. 71)
 Buddy Baker (No. 3)
 Tom Pistone (No. 12)
 James Hylton (No. 48)
 Buck Baker (No. 87)
 Clyde Lynn (No. 20)
 Frank Warren* (No. 79)
 Wendell Scott (No. 34)
 Jabe Thomas (No. 25)
 Bob Moore (No. 96)
 Paul Dean Holt (No. 01)
 Elmo Langley* (No. 64)
 Neil Castles* (No. 06)
 John Sears* (No. 4)
 LeeRoy Yarbrough* (No. 55)
 J.D. McDuffie* (No. 70)
 Roy Tyner* (No. 09)
 Richard Petty* (No. 43)
 Henley Gray* (No. 19)
 Frog Fagan* (No. 95)
 Bill Seifert* (No. 45)
 Bob Cooper* (No. 02)
 Stan Meserve* (No. 51)

* Driver failed to finish race

References

Dixie 250
Dixie 250
Dixie 250
NASCAR races at Augusta International Raceway